Weightlifting was introduced to Armenia in the late 1920s and became widely practiced after World War II. Today, it is one of the country's most popular sports. The sport is regulated by the Armenian Weightlifting Federation. The first weightlifters from Soviet Armenia made successful appearances the international stage in the 1970s. Vardan Militosyan won a silver at the 1976 Olympics, and later Yurik Vardanyan became an Olympic, World and European champion through the late 1970s and the early 1980s. Oksen Mirzoyan and Yurik Sarkisyan rose to top positions in the 1980s. After its independence from the Soviet Union, Armenia successfully held its weightlifting traditions and continues to be one of the strongest nations in Europe. In 2008, the Armenia team placed first at the European Championship. In the 2008 Summer Olympics Armenia won three bronze medals. Tigran Gevorg Martirosyan is Armenia's only world champion with his successful appearance in 2010.

Armenia's second largest city of Gyumri with a population of about 150,000, is well known for producing many prominent weightlifters, such as World and European weightlifting champions Yurik Vardanyan, Israel Militosyan, Gevorg Davtyan, Tigran G. Martirosyan and Nazik Avdalyan.

Name
Weightlifting is known in Armenian as either  tsanramart, composed of ծանր tsanr "heavy" and մարտ mart "fight" or ծանր աթլետիկա tsanr at'letika literally "heavy athletics" (via Russian тяжёлая атлетика).

History
The origins of weight lifting traces back to ancient history, most notably Ancient Greece. Modern weightlifting, however, is relatively new and was mainly organized and institutionalized in Europe and North America in the late 19th century. The current International Weightlifting Federation (IWF) was established in 1920. Weightlifting has been in all Summer Olympic Games except 1900, 1908 and 1912.

Soviet period
Weightlifting was introduced to Armenia in the first decade of Soviet rule in Armenia. In 1927, a weightlifting club was established in the Armenian Sport Committee. In 1928, the first weightlifting championship was held in Yerevan and the first Armenian weightlifters participated in the Transcacucasian and later in Soviet championship. In 1947, the first Armenian weightlifter competed in a European championship.

During the Cold War, the Soviet Union was, by far, the strongest nation in the world in the sport of weightlifting and Armenian athletes made a significant contribution in this.

By 1979, there were 205 weightlifting clubs in Soviet Armenia with around 5,200 people training in them. By the 1970s Armenian weightlifters began to play an important role in the Soviet Union's weightlifting program. The first Olympic medalist from the Armenian SSR was Vardan Militosyan, who won a silver medal at the 1976 Summer Olympics.

Yurik Vardanyan became the first weightlifter from Armenia to win a gold medal in weightlifting at the 1980 Summer Olympics. In a dominant performance, Vardanyan became the first ever light-heavyweight (82.5 kg) to lift a total of 400 kg in an official competition, shattering both the Olympic and world records. By contrast, middle-heavyweight gold medalist Peter Baczako (90 kg) totaled 377.5 kg and sub-heavyweight gold medalist Ota Zaremba (100 kg) totaled 395 kg. Vardanyan set the division record for a final time at the 1984 Friendship Games, an alternative to the Soviet-boycotted 1984 Summer Olympics, lifting a total of 405 kg. Vardanyan's achievements have not been matched since, as the current light-heavyweight record for the now 85 kg light heavyweight category (not including records set before the weight limit change) is currently 394 kg, set by Andrei Rybakou at the 2008 Summer Olympics. Vardanyan set 41 world records during his decorated career. For his accomplishments, Vardanyan earned the title Honoured Master of Sports of the USSR in 1977 and was awarded the Order of Lenin in 1985. In 1994 he was elected a member of the International Weightlifting Federation Hall of Fame.

To this day, Vardanyan is still seen as a hero in Armenia for his accomplishments in the sport of weightlifting. A stamp of Vardanyan was printed in 2010 in honor of him.

Along with Vardanyan, other significant Armenian weightlifters of the 1980s included 1980 Olympic silver medalist Yurik Sarkisyan, who set 12 world records during his career, and 1988 Olympic gold medalist Oksen Mirzoyan, who set also set 12 world records during his career.

At the 1992 Summer Olympics, Israel Militosyan, who previously won a silver medal at the 1988 Olympics, won a gold medal in the same division. Militosyan is, to this day, the final Armenian to win an Olympic gold medal. The 1992 Olympics signaled the end of Soviet weightlifting.

Independent Armenia
Armenia has so far set four world records in weightlifting, all in the snatch. Khachatur Kyapanaktsyan set two of them. Sergo Chakhoyan set another. Militosyan, who set a snatch world record twice in 1989 under the Soviet Union, set the record again in 1994 for Armenia.

Aghvan Grigoryan, who became the first Armenian Olympian to bear the flag of Armenia at the Summer Olympics in 1996, was a weightlifter. Arsen Melikyan became the first Armenian weightlifter for the independent Armenia to win an Olympic medal, having won a bronze medal at the 2000 Summer Olympics.

Armenian weightlifters were particularly successful in 2008. They came in first place at the 2008 European Weightlifting Championships and Tigran Gevorg Martirosyan, Gevorg Davtyan and Tigran Vardan Martirosyan all won bronze medals at the 2008 Summer Olympics, making it the most decorated Olympics for Armenia to date. Nazik Avdalyan won a gold medal at the 2009 World Weightlifting Championships and became the first weightlifter from the independent Armenia to win a gold medal at the World Weightlifting Championships. Tigran Gevorg Martirosyan also won a gold medal at the 2010 World Weightlifting Championships, becoming the first male weightlifter from independent Armenia to do so. Hripsime Khurshudyan became the first Armenian women to win an Olympic medal at the Olympics, having won a bronze medal in weightlifting at the 2012 Summer Olympics.

Oksen Mirzoyan later became the Head Coach of the Armenian national weightlifting team and is now the current Chairman of the Armenian Weightlifting Federation.

Armenia's statistics agency recorded a downward trend in the 21st century in the number of people practicing weightlifting. In 2005 Armenia had over 2,500 weightlifters, which dropped to 1,700 by 2021.

Records

Olympics

Note: Until 1991, Armenian SSR was part of the Soviet Union and in 1992, weightlifters from independent Armenia were part of the Unified Team

Men

Women

World Championships

Men

Women

European Championships

Men

Women

References

External links

 
Sport in Armenia